The North Egypt Conference (NEC) was an Illinois high school athletic conference in existence from 1929 to 2003.

Former members

State Titles (while a member of the NEC)

Additionally, the following trophies were won by NEC member schools while members of the conference (not necessarily in NEC-sanctioned sports):

State Titles (not while a member of the NEC)

References 

Illinois high school sports conferences